Courthouse Butte is a butte just north of the Village of Oak Creek, Arizona, south of Sedona in Yavapai County. It is just east of Bell Rock.

Geologically, Courthouse Butte is composed of horizontally bedded sedimentary rock of the Permian Supai Formation.

See also
 Cathedral Rock
 Schnebly Hill Formation

References

External links

 "Bell Rock Pathway". Coconino National Forest, includes Courthouse Butte and Bell Rock.

Buttes of Arizona
Landforms of Yavapai County, Arizona
Protected areas of Yavapai County, Arizona